Grand-Aigueblanche is a commune in the Savoie department in the Auvergne-Rhône-Alpes region in south-eastern France. It was established on 1 January 2019 by merger of the former communes of Aigueblanche (the seat), Le Bois and Saint-Oyen.

See also
Communes of the Savoie department

References

Communes of Savoie